The SRT Dark Red Line (also referred to as Thani Ratthaya Line), is part of the SRT Red Line suburban railway system to serve the greater Bangkok Metropolitan Region running for  between Krung Thep Aphiwat and Rangsit.

Construction started in 2013 and was originally due to be completed within 3 years by the end of  2016. However, the project experienced numerous delays. In May 2018, the SRT announced that the line was expected to open by October 2020. At the end of September 2019, civil construction was fully completed. The test runs were extended to Krung Thep Aphiwat Central Terminal from late November 2020.

In mid-November 2020, the Minister of Transport announced that free trial operations will operate from March 2021 with full-service operations expected from November 2021. In late February 2021, the SRT confirmed that free trial operations will commence on 26 March 2021 with full commercial operations starting on 28 July 2021. However, in July 2021 the SRT again postponed the free trial operations until 2 August 2021 with full commercial operations starting in November 2021.

The line finally opened for trial operations on 2 August 2021. Full commercial services began on 29 November 2021. A  extension of the line from Rangsit to Thammasat University has been delayed for tender until June 2022.

Route Alignment

Initially, the SRT Dark Red Line will run from the new Krung Thep Aphiwat Central Terminal north for  via Don Mueang and terminate at Rangsit in Pathum Thani Province.

History

In February 2009, then Prime Minister Abhisit Vejjajiva secured a 24 billion baht (US$685 million) loan from the Japanese Government for the  segment. The first Phase from Bang Sue to Rangsit was approved in 2010 but delayed due to a complicated 2.5 year contractual dispute.

The , 10 station Rangsit to Bang Sue section finally started construction in May 2013 after new contracts were signed in January 2013. A construction period of 3 years was stated. By the end of 2013, the project was only 3% done & already months behind schedule due to delays in removing the Hopewell Pillars. In June 2014, the SRT requested an additional 8.14 billion baht to modify the Dark Red line to 4 tracks instead of 3, to accordingly redesign all stations and to provide for the longer platforms for the Bang Sue Grand Station to cater for future HSR lines. The 8.14 billion baht requested composed of 4.32 billion baht for Contract 1 (modifications to Bang Sue Grand Station to cater for High Speed trains); 3.35 billion Baht for Contract 2 (4th track and stations redesign) and an extra 473 million baht for rolling stock (Contract 3).

The budget for the 1st Phase of the Dark Red Line project has progressively increased due to numerous delays and further redesigns of the project. From an initial estimated 59.89 billion baht in 2007, to 75.55 billion baht in 2009 and to 80.38 billion baht in 2012. The additional requested 8.14 billion baht increased the final budget to 88.52 billion baht.

Construction: Bang Sue to Rangsit 
The , 10 station Bang Sue to Rangsit section finally started construction in May 2013 with a scheduled construction period of 3 years. Construction works were delayed by 2 months due to site access issues for the contractor and delays related to removing slum dwellers residing within the right of way. However, it was hoped that the use of some of the old Hopewell pillars would speed up the initial construction timetable. By the end of 2013, the project was only 3% done & already months behind schedule due to a longer timetable in removing the Hopewell Pillars.

In June 2014, the SRT requested an additional 8.14 billion baht to modify the Dark Red line to 4 tracks instead of 3, to accordingly redesign all stations and to provide for the longer platforms for the Bang Sue Terminal to cater for future HSR lines. 8.140 billion baht request is; 4.32 billion baht for Contract 1 (modifications to Bang Sue Grand Station to cater for High Speed trains); 3.35 billion Baht for Contract 2 (4th track and stations redesign) and 473 million baht for Contract 3.

As of September 2017, civil works progress was stated to be 88.63%. By the end of September 2019 civil works were almost fully complete at 99.56% and Electrical and Signalling installation was at 45.60%. By July 2020, S&E installation was at 85.12% completion. By October 2020, 90% of the power supply for the line had been installed by the Metropolitan Electricity Authority (MEA) with all installation due for completion by November 2020.

Krung Thep Aphiwat Central Terminal 
Contract 1 of the project is for the construction of a new, 4 level Intercity Terminal to cater for all SRT Intercity Trains, SRT Red Line suburban trains and the yet to be built Airport Rail Link (Bangkok) extension. The delayed contract process was finally signed in January 2013. In August 2013, the SRT sought extra funds for the project to be redesigned in order to extend upper level platforms to a 400–600 m length in order to accommodate future planned High Speed Lines. (Funding was finally requested in June 2014 - see above section)

In March 2013, the new Bang Sue Grand Station started construction. Between March and June, excavation works for the foundation of the Terminal were delayed by the unearthing of numerous World War II unexploded bombs which required safe removal by army Explosive Ordnance Teams. As of July 2014, construction was 10% behind schedule.

The new Bang Sue Grand Station was originally scheduled to open by end of 2016 but the above-mentioned redesign work and other delays have resulted in an expected 2020 opening date. As of September 2017, construction progress of the station civil works was at 57.50%. By the end of September 2019 civil works were at 86.01%. As of July 2020, civil works were almost complete at 99.8%.

Rolling stock

The 3rd contract for the Dark Red Line is for electrical and systems (E&S) and procuring EMU rolling stock. As of April 2014, only 2 bidders remained but one of the bidding consortiums was disqualified on due to the fact that one of the consortium members (Maru Beni Corp) had convictions for bribery in an Indonesian bidding process.

This left MHSC Consortium (Mitsubishi and Hitachi and Sumitomo) as the sole bidder qualified for the contract. However, their bid of 28,899 million Baht was above the SRT median price of 26 billion baht which was set in 2010. The MHSC Consortium argued that their bid reflects 2013 prices after the minimum wage increase of January 2012. Finally, after a 2-year delay in the bidding process, in July 2014 JICA approved the loan for Contract 3. However, the coup of May 2014 delayed finalization leading to further review and negotiations. By mid 2016, negotiations had concluded and Hitachi promised that all rolling stock for the Dark Red line would be delivered by 2020. The contract specifies 25 EMUs consisting of ten 4 car sets and fifteen 6 car sets for 130 cars in total.

In late September 2019, the first 2 sets of rolling stock were shipped from Japan and both arrived in Thailand at Laem Chabang port on 12 October 2019 for shipment to Bangkok. By March 2020, 5 sets had been delivered.

As of July 2020, 13 sets - 7 of the 6 car sets and 6 of the 4 car sets - of the total 25 sets of rolling stock had been delivered with a further 2 sets due to be delivered by August 2020. By the end of September 2020, 21 sets had been delivered - 13 of the 6 car sets and 8 of the 4 car sets - with the final 4 sets to be delivered in October.

Operation
Services operate between 5:30am to 12am. Headways are every 20 minutes except for the peak periods (7am to 9am and 5pm to 7pm) where services depart every 12 minutes.

Distance based fares range from 12 to 42 baht.

Ridership
On the first full day of free trial operations on 3 August 2021 total passengers numbered 2914, on 4 August 2856 passengers used the line. By the end of September, this had increased to around 4,500-5000 passengers a day.

Future extensions 
In July 2016, the Thai Cabinet approved the first section of the southern extension from Bang Sue to Hua Lamphong. However, the  4 station northern extension from Rangsit to Thammasat University will be built first and was originally expected to be tendered by September 2018. This was delayed and then due to be tendered in the 2nd half of 2019. However, the tender has yet again been further delayed until 2021 as the Transport Minister has requested that the new Department of Railways investigate conducting PPP tenders for this extension. On 10 February 2021, the Department of Railways announced that in April 2021 the SRT would issue the tenders for the north extension to Thammasat University and the south extension to Hua Lamphong station. However, the PPP tender process was subject to further review. In October 2021, the SRT announced that the PPP tenders would not be released until June 2022 with the aim to sign contracts for the extensions (with 50 year leases) in July 2023.

Construction segments based on M-Map:

Phase II Rangsit–Thammasat University 
The , 4 stations was approved by Cabinet in 2016 and was expected to be tendered by September 2018. The extension to Thammasat University was then to be tendered in the 2nd half of 2019. However, the tender has further been delayed until 2021 as the transport minister has requested the new Department of Railways to investigate conducting PPP tenders for this extension.

Phase III Bang Sue–Hua Lamphong 
The , 7-station southern extension to Hua Lumphong station was approved by Cabinet in 2016. However, the northern extension to Thammasat University will be built before this section.

Phase IV & V Hua Lamphong–Bang Bon-Maha Chai  

Potential extension Maha Chai–Ratchaburi 
The Office of Transport and Traffic Policy and Planning (OTP) have studied the improvement and construction of the Mae Klong railway line which will be constructed through Samut Sakhon, Samut Songkhram and Ratchaburi provinces. Between Ban Khom railway station and Khlong Chak railway station, the line will be elevated across Ekachai road and deviate along the route of Rama II Road around the km 26 + 800 to the 32 + 160 km, then divert to the left to go straight to connect with the original train line.

From Samut Songkhram the suggested route will be constructed across the Mae Klong River. A third option is expected to be in use, which is to bypass Samut Songkhram city by diverging from the original train line about 66 km after passing Bang Kraboon railway station, which will be an elevated railway along the National Highway No. 325 to cross the Mae Klong Canal and Highway 325 at the intersection to Damnoen Saduak District, approximately 40 + 850 km and crossing the Mae Klong River. It will then revert to ground level and end at Pak Tho railway station, Ratchaburi which will build a train parallel with the royal highway number 3093 and will have 3 more new railway stations in this section. Expected total value of this project is approximately 42,243 million baht.

When completed, it will be a new southern railway line, which will help shorten the original train route, which originally runs through Nakhon Pathom and Ratchaburi before going to Pak Tho Station. The new Southern Railway will reduce the distance by about 43 kilometers and the aim of the project also includes the development of the Southwest Transport Center. However, as of 2016 this planned southern extension is very unlikely to be built as when Cabinet approved the northern extension to Thammasat University and the Southern extension to Hua Lumphong, only the original project scope to Maha Chai was referenced.

List of stations 
Currently, services operate as all stops. Express trains will likely enter operation after additional phases are completed.

Network Map

See also

 Mass Rapid Transit Master Plan in Bangkok Metropolitan Region
 SRT Light Red Line
 Airport Rail Link (Bangkok)
 BTS Skytrain
 Sukhumvit Line
 Silom Line
 MRT (Bangkok)
 MRT Blue Line
 MRT Brown Line
 MRT Grey Line
 MRT Light Blue Line
 MRT Orange Line
 MRT Pink Line
 MRT Purple Line
 MRT Yellow Line
 Bangkok BRT
 BMA Gold Line

References

External links

 "SRT Red Line website"
 Airport Rail Link, BTS, MRT & BRT network map

Dark
Bangkok Commuter rail lines
Railway lines opened in 2021